The women's team pursuit competition of the cycling events at the 2019 Pan American Games was held on August 1 and August 2 at the Velodrome.

Records
Prior to this competition, the existing world and Games records were as follows:

Schedule

Results

Qualification
The eight teams recording the best times in the qualifying round will be matched in the First round as follows: The 6th fastest team against the 7th fastest team. The 5th fastest team against the 8th fastest team. The 2nd fastest team against the 3rd fastest team. The fastest team against the 4th fastest team.

First round
The winners of heats 3 and 4 in the First round ride the final for the gold and silver medals. The remaining six teams will be ranked by their times in the First round and will be paired as follows: The two fastest teams ride the final for the bronze medal.

Finals
The final classification is determined in the medal finals.

References

Track cycling at the 2019 Pan American Games
Women's team pursuit (track cycling)